The 2013–14 Virginia Cavaliers men's basketball team represented the University of Virginia during the 2013–14 NCAA Division I men's basketball season. The team was led by head coach Tony Bennett, in his fifth season, and played their home games at John Paul Jones Arena as members of the Atlantic Coast Conference.

The 2013–14 season was one of the most successful in UVa's 109-year basketball history. The Cavaliers won only their second ever outright ACC regular season title, with a 16–2 conference record (at the time, their best conference record in program history), as well as only their second ever ACC tournament title. They also won 30 games for only the second time in school history (the first being in 1981–82) and finished third in the final AP Poll—their highest final national ranking in 30 years. On March 16, 2014, the Cavaliers received a #1 seed in the NCAA tournament. In the NCAA Tournament, they defeated Coastal Carolina and Memphis to advance to the Sweet Sixteen, where they lost to Michigan State.

Class of 2013 signees

Roster

Schedule 

|-
!colspan=9 style="background:#0d3268; color:#ff7c00;"| Non-conference regular season

|-
!colspan=9 style="background:#0d3268; color:#ff7c00;"| Conference regular season

|-
!colspan=9 style="background:#0d3268; color:#ff7c00;"| ACC Tournament

|-
!colspan=9 style="background:#0d3268; color:#ff7c00;"| NCAA tournament

Rankings

Team players drafted into the NBA

References

Virginia Cavaliers men's basketball seasons
Virginia
Virginia
Virginia Cavaliers men's basketball team
Virginia Cavaliers men's basketball team